A double referendum was held in Kyrgyzstan on 2 February 2003. Voters were asked whether they approved of amendments to the constitution, and whether President Askar Akayev should be allowed to remain in office until 2005. Both were approved by wide margins.

Background
The proposed amendments to the constitution would increase the powers of the President, decrease the powers of the Supreme Council, and make several other changes to the Council, including making it unicameral and reducing the total number of seats in the two houses from 105 to 75 in a single house. They also reduced the role of the Constitutional Court, although gave it the power to oversee the constitutionality of political parties, social organisations and religious organisations.

Results

Constitutional amendments

President Akayev to remain in office until 2005

References

2003 in Kyrgyzstan
2003 referendums
Referendums in Kyrgyzstan
Constitutional referendums in Kyrgyzstan